Katherine Marlea Clark (born July 17, 1963) is an American lawyer and politician who has served as the U.S. representative for Massachusetts's 5th congressional district since 2013. She has been House Minority Whip since 2023 and was Assistant House Democratic Leader (known as the "Assistant Speaker") from 2021 to 2023. Her district includes many of Boston's northern and western satellite cities and suburbs, such as Medford, Framingham, Woburn, Waltham, and her home city of Revere. Clark was a member of the Massachusetts House of Representatives from 2008 to 2011 and the Massachusetts Senate from 2011 to 2013.

Born in Connecticut, Clark worked as an attorney in several states before moving to Massachusetts in 1995, where she worked in state government. She joined the Melrose School Committee in 2002, becoming committee chair in 2005. She was first elected to the state legislature in 2008, and contributed to legislation regarding criminal justice, education, and municipal pensions. She is in her sixth term in Congress, having won the 2013 special election for the U.S. House of Representatives to succeed Ed Markey in the 5th district, and sits on the House Appropriations Committee.

Early life and career
Katherine Marlea Clark was born on July 17, 1963, in New Haven, Connecticut. She attended St. Lawrence University, Cornell Law School, and Harvard's John F. Kennedy School of Government. She studied in Nagoya, Japan, in 1983.

In her early career, she worked as an attorney in Chicago. She then moved to Colorado, where she worked as a clerk for Judge Alfred A. Arraj of the United States District Court for the District of Colorado and later as a staff attorney for the Colorado District Attorneys' Council. She moved to Massachusetts in 1995 and became general counsel for the state Office of Child Care Services.

Local politics
In 2001, Clark moved to Melrose, where she was elected to the Melrose School Committee, taking her seat in January 2002. She first ran for the Massachusetts Senate in 2004 and lost to Republican incumbent Richard Tisei. In January 2005, she was unanimously elected chairwoman of the Melrose School Committee. In 2006, she ran for the 32nd Middlesex seat in the Massachusetts House of Representatives when incumbent Mike Festa began a run for Middlesex district attorney but withdrew after he dropped out of the race.

Clark was appointed co-chair of Victory 2006, the state Democratic Party's campaign and fundraising effort for the 2006 gubernatorial election. She spent some time as chief of policy and government relations in the Massachusetts Attorney General's office.

Massachusetts legislature

Massachusetts House of Representatives
Festa resigned his state House seat in October 2007 to become secretary of elder affairs in the Deval Patrick administration, and Clark entered the special election to succeed him. During the campaign, she emphasized her experience as an attorney and made "developing stability in state aid" her top policy issue. She won the Democratic primary in January with 65% of the vote, defeating two other Melrose Democrats. She defeated Republican real estate businessman Mark B. Hutchison, 63% to 37%. In November 2008, she was reelected to a full term unopposed.

Sworn in on March 13, 2008, Clark represented Melrose and Wakefield. She served on both the education, judiciary, and municipalities and the regional government committees.

Massachusetts Senate
When Tisei resigned from the state senate to run for lieutenant governor of Massachusetts, Clark ran for his seat. In the Democratic primary, she defeated Stoneham attorney Michael S. Day, 64%–36%. In the November 2010 general election, she defeated Republican Craig Spadafora, 52%–48%.

Clark was sworn in on January 5, 2011. She supports abortion rights and has been endorsed in her campaigns by NARAL Pro-Choice Massachusetts and the Planned Parenthood Advocacy Fund.

In 2011, Clark was co-chair of the Joint Committee on Public Service, where she was lead author of the Senate version of a bill to reform municipal pensions. For her work in 2011, she received legislator of the year awards from the Massachusetts Municipal Association and the Massachusetts Police Association. In 2012, she authored a law that takes steps to ensure that all Massachusetts students read at grade level by third grade. Also in 2012, her bill extending restraining orders in domestic violence cases to cover victims' pets, which are often used as pawns in abusive relationships, was signed as part of a larger law on animal shelters. In 2013, she co-sponsored a bill expanding the state's wiretapping authority, which was strictly limited under existing law, in order to help police better investigate violent street crime. At the same time, she co-sponsored a bill to secure electronic privacy protections, requiring police to have probable cause before investigating the electronic records of individuals. She filed another bill tightening sex offender laws, imposing stricter penalties and making offender data more accessible to agencies and the public. The Women's Bar Association of Massachusetts named Clark its 2013 Legislator of the Year for her service on women's issues.

Clark's committee assignments in the state Senate were as follows:
 Judiciary (Chair)
 Mental Health and Substance Abuse (Vice Chair)
 Post Audit and Oversight (Vice Chair)
 Public Health
 Public Safety and Homeland Security
 Steering and Policy (Chair)

U.S House of Representatives

Elections

2013 special 

The district's longtime incumbent, Ed Markey, had just been elected to the United States Senate six months into his 19th term. In a heavily contested Democratic primary—the real contest in this heavily Democratic district—she was endorsed by Massachusetts attorney general Martha Coakley and EMILY's List. On October 15, 2013, she won the primary with a plurality of 32% of the vote. Her closest competitor was Middlesex County Sheriff Peter Koutoujian, with 22% of the vote. On December 10, as expected, she easily won the special election.

Tenure 
Clark was sworn into office on December 12, 2013, and sits on the House Appropriations Committee. In a 2014 interview with The Boston Globe, she compared life in Washington to the television series House of Cards, saying "It's exactly like here, minus the murders."

Clark was unopposed in her bid for a full term in 2014.

In March 2015, Clark decided not to attend the speech by Israeli prime minister Benjamin Netanyahu before a joint session of Congress. She affirmed a commitment to maintaining and strengthening the relationship between the U.S. and Israel but noted that the invitation was offered without first consulting the Obama administration.

Clark has introduced legislation in response to Internet harassment, most notably resulting from the Gamergate controversy, and has advocated for more stringent enforcement of existing laws. After introducing legislation that would criminalize "swatting" (falsely reporting an ongoing critical incident to dispatch an emergency response), she was herself targeted by a false report of an active shooter at her home.

In January 2017, Clark announced a boycott of Donald Trump's inauguration. She was part of a small group of House and Senate members who chose to boycott the ceremony. Her reason was her desire not to "normalize" Trump's promotion of "bigoted, misogynist, anti-Semitic, and racist claims."

House Democratic Caucus vice chair
On November 28, 2018, it was announced that Clark had defeated California congressman Pete Aguilar to succeed Linda Sánchez as vice chair of the House Democratic Caucus.

House Democratic assistant speaker
On November 18, 2020, it was announced that Clark had defeated Rhode Island congressman David Cicilline by a vote of 135 to 92 to succeed Ben Ray Luján as assistant speaker, the number four spot in Democratic house leadership.

House Democratic whip
Clark has been mentioned as a possible candidate to succeed Pelosi as Speaker of the House. But after Pelosi, Steny Hoyer, and Jim Clyburn announced their retirement from party leadership in November 2022, Clark instead announced a bid for party whip. After running unopposed, Clark was elected as the minority whip on November 30, 2022.

Committee assignments 

 Committee on Appropriations 
 Subcommittee on Labor, Health and Human Services, Education
 Subcommittee on Transportation, Housing and Urban Development
 Subcommittee on the Legislative Branch

Caucus memberships

 Animal Protection Caucus
 Armenian Caucus
 Autism Caucus
 Baby Caucus
 Bicameral Task Force on Climate Change
 Biomedical Research Caucus
 Bipartisan Congressional Task Force on Alzheimer’s Disease
 Career and Technical Education
 Congressional Asian Pacific American Caucus (CAPAC)
 Congressional Women's Caucus
 Cranberry Caucus
 Internet Caucus
 Hellenic Caucus
 Heroin Task Force
 LGBT Equality Caucus
 Medicare for All Caucus
 Peace Corps Caucus
 Pre-K Caucus
 Prescription Drug Abuse Caucus
 Safe Climate Caucus
 Small Brewers Caucus
 Sustainable Energy & Environment Coalition
 Tom Lantos Human Rights Commission
Congressional Progressive Caucus

Personal life
Clark is married to Rodney S. Dowell, chief bar counsel for the Massachusetts Board of Bar Overseers, the state entity that regulates the legal profession in Massachusetts. They live in Revere and have three children.  In January 2023, Clark confirmed that her adult daughter was arrested for assault by means of a dangerous weapon and damage to property by graffiti/tagging Boston Common's Parkman Bandstand with the words "NO COP CITY" and "ACAB".

When Congress is in session, Clark rooms with Representatives Annie Kuster, Grace Meng, Lois Frankel, Cheri Bustos, and Julia Brownley.

See also
 Women in the United States House of Representatives

References

External links

 Congresswoman Katherine Clark official U.S. House website
 Katherine Clark for Congress

 

|-

|-

|-

|-

|-

|-

|-

1963 births
21st-century American politicians
21st-century American women politicians
American women lawyers
Cornell Law School alumni
Democratic Party members of the United States House of Representatives from Massachusetts
Female members of the United States House of Representatives
Harvard Kennedy School alumni
Living people
Massachusetts lawyers
Democratic Party Massachusetts state senators
Democratic Party members of the Massachusetts House of Representatives
People from Melrose, Massachusetts
Politicians from New Haven, Connecticut
St. Lawrence University alumni
Women state legislators in Massachusetts